Saint Francis' Institution (abbreviated SFI) is a public all-boys school in Malacca, Malaysia with La Sallian tradition. It is called 'SFI' by the local population. Alumni, or Old Boys, are known as 'Franciscans' or 'Lasallians'.

School Crest
The School Badge is an emblem that incorporates a star, an armorial bearing, the Famosa Gate, and an open book, to show respectively the School's association with the De La Salle Order; its connection with its Patron, St. Francis Xavier; its location in the most historic town in Malaysia; and its purpose which is education.

The badge is a shield with four quarters.

In the top left-hand quarter is a gold star on a black background. The top right-hand quarter has three parallel divisions arranged horizontally. The top division is coloured red, the middle one is a chess-board pattern with alternating squares of black and white, and the lowest division is plain white or silver. On the red background of the top division there are three crescents, so arranged that the points of the horns coincide, and while the top and lowest crescents have alternating squares of black and white, the middle crescent has a white, or silver colour. This heraldic device of horizontal divisions and crescent was the coat-of-arms of the Castle of Xavier, the ancestral home of St. Francis. In the quarter beneath the star is the design of the Famosa Gate, an historical Malacca ruin, and the Gate is coloured red, the original colour of the laterite from which the gate was constructed. In the last quarter is an open book, yellowish green in colour on a black background, and showing the words ‘Initium Sapientiae’ meaning ‘The beginning of wisdom’.

Above the shield is a helmet surmounted by a cross on three steps, and a mantle, of gold and brown leaves, hangs front the helmet to provide a decoration for the shield. Beneath the shield is the motto ‘Age Quod Agis’ which is the best translated as ‘Whatever You Do, Do It Well’.

List of Brother Directors
 1902 - 1903 : Bro. Maurice Joseph
 1903 - 1911 : Bro. Alman Dositheus
 1911 - 1915 : Bro. Lewis Edward
 1915 - 1916 : Bro. Claude-Marie
 1916 - 1918 : Bro. Lewis Edward
 1918 - 1920 : Bro. V. Augustus
 1920 - 1921 : Bro. Lewis Edward
 1921 - 1923 : Bro. Claude-Marie
 1923 - 1929 : Bro. Barnitus Kennedy
 1930 - 1931 : Bro. Defendant Louis
 1931 - 1936 : Bro. Dominic John
 1936 - 1947 : Bro. V. Augustus
 1948 - 1953 : Bro. Edmund McCullagh
 1953 - 1956 : Bro. T. Michael
 1956 - 1956 : Bro. Patrick Donovan
 1956 - 1958 : Bro. Leonard Aloysius
 1959 - 1962 : Bro. Alban De Rozario
 1962 - 1966 : Bro. Anthony McNamara
 1967 - 1968 : Bro. Edwin Cheng
 1969 - 1971 : Bro. Phillip Daly
 1972 - 1976 : Bro. Cassian Pappu
 1977 - 1988 : Bro. Harold Reynolds
 1988 – Present : Bro. Ambrose Loke

List of Principals
 2000 - 2009       : Ong Chong Wee
 2009 - 2011       : Chong Chew Yoong (Acting Principal)
 2011 - 2014       : Lee Bun Chuan
 2014 - 2018       : Lee Chee Choon
 2019 - 2022     : Cheong Lee Chin
 2022 - Present   : Lee Soon Luwi

See also
 Education in Malaysia

References

External links 

 The Franciscan - The Official St. Francis' Institution Website
 St. Francis' Institution - Official School Website

Primary schools in Malaysia
Secondary schools in Malaysia
Catholic schools in Malaysia
Lasallian schools in Malaysia
Educational institutions established in 1880
1880 establishments in British Malaya
Publicly funded schools in Malaysia
Boys' schools in Malaysia